Psammophis indochinensis, also known as the Indo-Chinese sand snake, is a species of snake in the family Psammophiidae. Its conservation status is of "least concern". It is found at low elevations in Thailand, Cambodia, Laos, and Myanmar.

References 

Psammophis
Snakes of Southeast Asia
Reptiles of Cambodia
Reptiles of Laos
Reptiles of Myanmar
Reptiles of Thailand
Reptiles described in 1943
Taxa named by Malcolm Arthur Smith